There are two types of "open rates"- one for electronic mail (aka e-mail; see below) and one for physical mail (aka snail mail via the USPS or other physical mail carrier).

Email Open Rate 

The email open rate is a measure primarily used by marketers as an indication of how many people "view" or "open" the commercial electronic mail they send out. It is most commonly expressed as a percentage and calculated by dividing the number of email messages opened by the total number of email messages sent (excluding those that bounced.)

Some Email Service Providers (ESP) also track unique email opens. Similar to an email open, unique email opens eliminate all duplicate opens that occur.

Tracking Email Open Rates Open rates are typically tracked using a transparent 1x1 pixel, or small transparent tracking image,  that is embedded in outgoing emails. When the client or browser used to display the email requests that image, then an "open" is recorded for that email by the image's host server. The email will not be counted as an open until one of the following occurs:

 The recipient enables the images in the email or
 The recipient interacts with the email by clicking on a link

The open rate of any given email can vary based on a number of variables. For example, the type of industry the email is being sent to. In addition, the day and time an email is scheduled or sent to recipients can have an effect on email open rate. The length of an email's subject line can also affect whether or not it is opened.

Tracking Concerns Open rates is one of the earliest metrics applied in email marketing, but its continued use has become controversial due to conflicting views on its usefulness.

The open rate for an email sent to multiple recipients is then most often calculated as the total number of "opened" emails, expressed as a percentage of the total number of emails sent or—more usually—delivered. The number delivered is itself measured as the number of emails sent out minus the number of bounces generated by those emails.

This method leads to problems with interpretation, since the request for the tracking image gives no indication of whether the email's recipient actually viewed or read the email or its contents.

In addition, many webmail services and email clients block images by default, or the recipient may elect to receive text-only versions of an email. In both cases, no image call can ever be made, further reducing the accuracy of the open rate measure.

As a result, open rates are broadly rejected as an absolute measure of a commercial email's performance. However, many marketers use open rates as a relative measure, for example to compare the performances of emails sent to similar recipient groups, but at different times or with different subject headers.

Physical Mail Open Rate 

The "open rate" for physical mail is difficult to quantify when compared to electronic mail, but it is extremely important to the success or failure of response-oriented mail (marketing, billing, recovery, renewals, etc.). In fact, physical mail open rates can, and should, be further segmented and defined:

Open Rate (physical mail):  The rate at which a piece of mail is opened within 30 days, as determined by the recipient’s conscious and sub-conscious judgments about the un-opened mail piece; this decision is often made in 3–5 seconds.

Open NOW Rate (physical mail):  The rate at which a piece of mail is opened while it is being looked at for the first time, as determined by the recipient’s conscious and sub-conscious judgments about the un-opened mail piece; this decision is often made in 3–5 seconds.

Though physical mail, also known as "snail mail" or direct mail, may be overshadowed by email marketing, it's still considered an important part of some business' marketing strategy.

See also 

 Web bug
 E-mail tracking
 Email marketing
 click rates

== References ==

Email
Online advertising
Rates